The MHRA Style Guide: A Handbook for Authors, Editors, and Writers of Theses—formerly the MHRA Style Book—is an academic style guide published by the Modern Humanities Research Association. It is most widely used in the arts and humanities in the United Kingdom, where the MHRA is based. 

Initially, the Book and Guide were only available for sale in the UK and in the United States.  50,000 copies of all editions, published between 1971 and 2013, have been sold worldwide.

Availability
The 3rd edition of the Style Guide (reprinted with corrections in 2015) can be downloaded free of charge, as a PDF formatted document, from the MHRA's official website. 
Since 2017, an online version is available, in full and in a condensed Quick Guide format. Both online versions are also free of charge.

Print versions of the most current edition continue to be offered.

Publication history

MHRA Style Book
 1971: first edition
 1978: second edition
 1981: third edition
 1991: fourth edition
 1995: fourth edition reprinted with amendments
 1996: fifth edition

MHRA Style Guide
 2002: first edition
 2008: second edition
 2013: third edition
 2015: third edition reprinted with minor corrections

References

External links
 MHRA Style Guide

Style guides for British English
Academic style guides